Hondón de los Frailes is a municipality and village in the province of Alicante and autonomous community of Valencia, Spain.

References

Municipalities in the Province of Alicante